Oscar is an unincorporated community in Bell County, in the U.S. state of Texas. According to the Handbook of Texas, the community had a population of 40 in 2000. It is located within the Killeen-Temple-Fort Hood metropolitan area.

History
The community first came into existence when several Czech families settled in the area in the late 19th century. A post office was established at Oscar in 1892 and remained in operation until 1904. Oscar had 115 residents that were served by a cotton gin, a hotel, a general store, a blacksmith, and a barber in 1896. It plunged to 40 residents alongside two businesses in 1946. Both businesses closed thereafter, and its population was reported as 40 from 1990 through 2000.

Geography

Education
Oscar had its own school in 1946. Today, the community is served by the Rogers Independent School District.

References

Czech communities in the United States
Unincorporated communities in Texas
Unincorporated communities in Bell County, Texas